Mission San Cosme y Damián de Tucsón, originally known as Mission San Agustín del Tucson, was a Spanish mission located in present-day Tucson, Pima County, Arizona. It was established in 1692 by Jesuit missionary Eusebio Francisco Kino as a visita, or "visiting chapel", of the nearby Mission San Xavier del Bac. Today, almost nothing remains of the original complex.

Location
The mission was located along the western bank of the Santa Cruz River, at the base of Sentinel Peak or "A" Mountain. The Sobaipuri village of Chuk Shon, meaning "at the foot of the black mountain", was located nearby.

History

The mission would be built, near the Sobaipuri village of Chuk Shon which Padre Eusebio Francisco Kino named San Cosmé del Tucson.  Here  Father Kino established a visita, or "visiting chapel", of Mission San Xavier del Bac in 1692.  In 1768 the visita was expanded, fortified and renamed Mission San Agustín del Tucson by the Franciscans who had just replaced the Jesuits in the Missions.  This was soon followed by the establishment of a Presidio San Augustin del Tucson in 1776 on the east side of the Santa Cruz River. The pueblo of Tucson grew up near the Presido along the river.

The Mission was finally abandoned in 1828. Its lands were sold off and the neglected buildings were eventually destroyed.

Between 1950 and 2010, the site served as a landfill for the city of Tucson.

Present day
Since 2010, site has been under the care of the non-profit organization Friends of Tucson’s Birthplace. The former landfill and mission site is being repurposed as a historical and nature park called Tucson Origins Heritage Park.

See also
 List of Jesuit sites
 Spanish missions in Arizona

References

  Bancroft, Hubert Howe, 1888, History of Arizona and New Mexico, 1530–1888. The History Company, San Francisco.
 Spanish Colonial Tucson; Dobyns, Henry F, 1976, University of Arizona Press, Tucson. .

Catholic Church in Arizona
Jesuit history in North America
1692 establishments in New Spain
1768 establishments in New Spain
History of Pima County, Arizona
Tohono O'odham